Know You Better may refer to:

 "Know You Better" (Ayla Brown song)
 "Know You Better" (Mileo song)
 "Know You Better" (Omarion song)